The 1908 Syracuse Orangemen football team represented Syracuse University in the 1908 college football season. The team was coached by first-year head coach Howard Jones.

Schedule

References

Syracuse
Syracuse Orange football seasons
Syracuse Orangemen football